Dryodromya is a genus of flies in the family Empididae.

Species
D. testacea Rondani, 1856

References

Empidoidea genera
Empididae
Taxa named by Camillo Rondani